San Juan de La Arena (L'Arena) is one of five parishes (administrative divisions) in Soto del Barco, a municipality within the province and autonomous community of Asturias, in northern Spain.

Parishes in Soto del Barco